Vodopyanov is a Slavic surname in the masculine form, found most commonly in Cossack, Russian and Ukrainian communities. Variants include: Vodopianov, Vodopianoff, Wodopjanow. (Cyrillic: Водопьянов, Вадопьянов Водоп'янов) The female variant is Vodopyanova (Водопьянова). 

Notable people with the surname Vodopyanov include:
Konstantin L. Vodopyanov, American physicist
Mikhail Vodopyanov (1899–1980), Russian aviator and World War II pilot
Sergey Vodopyanov (born 1987), Russian boxer
Vitali Vodopyanov (born 1974), Russian footballer
 (1855-1912), Colonel in Tsarist Army
 (1865-1943), Russian Cossack commander in the Russo-Japanese War
Notable people with the surname Vodopyanova include:
Natalia Vodopyanova, Russian Basketballer
Tetyana Vodopyanova, Ukrainian Athlete